Richard John Bradley,  (born 18 November 1946) is a British archaeologist and academic. He specialises in the study of European prehistory, and in particular Prehistoric Britain. From 1987 to 2013, he was Professor of Archaeology at the University of Reading; he is now emeritus professor. He is also the author of a number of books on the subject of archaeology and prehistory.

British Archaeology magazine commented that Bradley was one of the best respected archaeologists in the field.

Early life and education
Bradley was born on 18 November 1946 in Hampshire, England. His father was a metallurgist in the British Navy. He was educated at Portsmouth Grammar School, then an all-boys direct grant grammar school in Portsmouth. It was at school where he first became interested in archaeology. He went on to study law at Magdalen College, Oxford, and graduated from the University of Oxford with a Bachelor of Arts (BA) degree; as per tradition, his BA was later promoted to a Master of Arts (MA Oxon) degree. He did not involve himself in the counterculture of the 1960s, disliking the music associated with it and the "pretentiousness" of many of those involved who had come from private schools.

Archaeological career
Not wishing to enter the legal profession, he focused on archaeology, working as an amateur in the field and authoring academic papers, some of which saw publication in national journals. Without a single qualification in archaeology, aged 25 he was appointed an assistant lecturer at Reading University. He was a lecturer in archaeology from 1971 to 1984, Reader in Archaeology from 1984 to 1987, and Professor of Archaeology from 1987 to 2013. In 1999 and 2000 he led the excavation of Tomnaverie stone circle which showed that, contrary to expectation, the internal ring cairn was constructed before the stone circle and was possibly designed to accommodate the later circle. He retired from full-time academia in 2013, and was appointed emeritus professor.

Personal life
In 1976, Bradley married Katherine Bowden. She is a history teacher by profession. They do not have any children.

Honours
On 13 January 1977, Bradley was elected a Fellow of the Society of Antiquaries of London (FSA). In 1995, he was elected a Fellow of the British Academy (FBA), the United Kingdom's national academy for the humanities and social sciences. In 2007, he was elected an honorary Fellow of the Society of Antiquaries of Scotland (Hon. FSAScot).

In 2006, Bradley was awarded the Grahame Clark Medal by the British Academy.

Selected works

Books

References

British archaeologists
Prehistorians
Living people
Academics of the University of Reading
1946 births
Fellows of the British Academy
Fellows of the Society of Antiquaries of London
Alumni of Magdalen College, Oxford
Recipients of the Grahame Clark Medal
Fellows of the Society of Antiquaries of Scotland